The 2004–2005 Purefoods Tender Juicy Hotdogs season was the 17th season of the franchise in the Philippine Basketball Association (PBA) and 4th season under the ownership of San Miguel Corporation.

Draft picks

Occurrences
Upon celebrating his 38th birthday in November 2004, Purefoods power forward and four-time MVP Alvin Patrimonio called it quits and retired from active competition a month after the opening of the PBA's 2004–05 season, ending a storied 16-year career and becoming one of the few players to have spent his whole pro career playing for only one team. Patrimonio's last full conference was in the transition tournament called Fiesta Conference earlier in the year.

Roster

Philippine Cup

Game log

|- bgcolor="#bbffbb"
| 1
| October 6
| Brgy.Ginebra
| 104-87
| Castillo (22)
| 
| 
| Araneta Coliseum
| 1–0
|- bgcolor="#bbffbb"
| 2
| October 10
| Coca Cola
| 78-76
| Raymundo (22)
|  
| 
| Araneta Coliseum
| 2–0
|- bgcolor="#edbebf"
| 3
| October 15
| Red Bull
| 81–101
| Raymundo (21)
| 
| 
| Philsports Arena
| 2–1
|- bgcolor="#edbebf"
| 4
| October 19
| Talk 'N Text
| 87–101
| 
| 
| 
| Dumaguete
| 2–2 
|- bgcolor="#bbffbb"
| 5
| October 22
| Sta.Lucia
| 89-87
| Castillo (20) Limpot (20)
| 
| 
| Philsports Arena
| 3–2
|- bgcolor="#edbebf"
| 6
| October 29
| FedEx
| 98–102
| 
| 
| 
| Araneta Coliseum
| 3–3

|-bgcolor="#bbffbb"
| 13
| December 2
| Coca Cola
| 82-76
| Raymundo (17)
| 
| 
| Lipa City
| 7–6
|-bgcolor="#edbebf"
| 14
| December 8
| San Miguel
| 86–93
| Raymundo (20)
| 
| 
| Philsports Arena
| 7–7
|-bgcolor="#edbebf"
| 15
| December 10
| Sta.Lucia
| 89–91
| 
| 
| 
| Araneta Coliseum
| 7–8
|-bgcolor="#bbffbb"
| 16
| December 14
| Red Bull
| 92-88
| Castillo (19)
| 
| 
| Cavite City
| 8–8
|-bgcolor="#edbebf"
| 17
| December 17
| Alaska
| 70–86
| Limpot (15)
| 
| 
| Ynares Center
| 8–9
|-bgcolor="#bbffbb"
| 18
| December 22
| FedEx
| 112-110
| Simon (23)
| 
| 
| Philsports Arena
| 9–9

Transactions

Trades

Additions

Recruited imports 

GP – Games played

References

Purefoods
Magnolia Hotshots seasons